is a district of Narashino City, Chiba Prefecture, Japan, consisting of 1-chōme to 7-chōme. The name “Tsudanuma” is also used to refer to the area around Tsudanuma Station ranging over Narashino and Funabashi cities.

Etymology

Character
Tsudanuma is a residential area, largely by virtue of being a commuter suburb of Tokyo. It is mentioned in Haruki Murakami's novels  1Q84, Hard-Boiled Wonderland and the End of the World, and Sputnik Sweetheart.

Demographics
The population as of October 31st 2017 is shown below.

Transportation

Rail service
The Tsudanuma area is directly served by three stations:
Tsudanuma Station (JR East Sōbu Main Line)
Keisei Tsudanuma Station ( Keisei Main Line,  Keisei Chiba Line, and  Shin-Keisei Line)
Shin-Tsudanuma Station ( Shin-Keisei Line)

Bus service
There is a fleet of Shin-Keisei buses which depart from JR Tsudanuma station.

Taxi service
Taxis are available at all three railway stations.

Commerce
Shops and department stores surround JR Tsudanuma station.
 Aeon Mall Tsudanuma (Tsudanuma 1-chōme)
 Ito Yokado Tsudanuma (Tsudanuma 1-chōme)
 Kanadenomori Forte (Kanadenomori 2-chōme)
 Mina Tsudanuma (Tsudanuma 1-chōme)
 Morisia Tsudanuma (Yatsu 1-chōme)
 Tsudanuma Parco (Maebara-Nishi 2-chōme, Funabashi City)

Education

There are a number of public schools in the area as well as the Chiba Institute of Technology and O-Hara Graduate School.  For continuing education, Narashino Bunka Hall (習志野文化ホール) is located on the south exit of JR Tsudanuma station.

References

External links
 Chiba Institute of Technology
 O-Hara Graduate School (Tsudanuma Branch) (Japanese)
 Mina Tsudanuma (Japanese)
 Bus Routes from JR Tsudanuma Station (Japanese)
 Narashino Bunka Hall (Japanese)

Populated places in Chiba Prefecture
Narashino